"Este Corazón" (English: "This Heart") is the third radio single and fourth and last official single from the Mexican band RBD's second studio album, Nuestro Amor (2005). Although having a version in Portuguese, it was only played as the second opening of the third season of the telenovela Rebelde and not released to radio in Brazil.

Release
The song was released in March 2006 to Mexican radio stations, as the album's fourth and last single.

Although the song had not been officially released in the United States, the song managed to chart within the Billboard Hot Latin Tracks at number 10. It was nominated by the public as one of the most romantic songs of the year for Univision's trendy Premios Juventud, which aired on July 13, 2006.

The song became a hit on the U.S. radio as it has been named 'Hot Shot' of the Hot Latin Songs on Billboard.com on June 13, 2006 when it climbed 57 spots from #96 to #39 during one week. It reached its peak on the Hot Latin Tracks Chart at number 10.

Music video
The video was only used as the second opening in the telenovela's third season. On February 14, 2006, the show's producers surprised the audience with the premiere of the opening video featuring the band performing the song.

Award

Charts

References

2006 singles
RBD songs
Spanish-language songs
Pop ballads
Songs written by Armando Ávila
Song recordings produced by Armando Ávila